The Tenth Kerala Legislative Assembly Council of Ministers, third E. K. Nayanar ministry, was a Kerala Council of Ministers (Kerala Cabinet), the executive wing of Kerala state government, led by CPI (M) leader E. K. Nayanar from May 1996 to May 2001. It had sixteen ministries and overall twenty ministers.

The Kerala Council of Ministers, during Nayanar's third term as Chief Minister of Kerala, consisted of:

Ministers

Trivia 
This was the third and last term of E. K. Nayanar as the Chief Minister, and the only one in which he completed a full term as chief minister. He did not contest in the 1996 Legislative elections, and V. S. Achuthanandan, another senior Communist leader, was designated as the Chief Minister candidate. When the election results came, the Left Democratic Front won the majority of seats, but Achuthanandan lost. In this special situation, a meeting was held by the CPI (M), which unanimously supported Nayanar as the Chief Minister. When Nayanar left the office after completing his term in May 2001, he had become the longest served Chief Minister of Kerala, serving for 4009 days in total.

See also 
 Chief Ministers of Kerala
 Kerala Ministers

References

Nayanar 03
1996 establishments in Kerala
2001 disestablishments in India
Cabinets established in 1996
Cabinets disestablished in 2001

ml:കേരള മന്ത്രിസഭ